Exeter House School is a mixed special school in Salisbury, Wiltshire, England.

The school educates children with severe and profound and multiple learning difficulties. These difficulties may be caused by autism spectrum disorders and other communication and language problems.

The school is called Exeter House because it was originally based in Exeter House in Exeter Street in Salisbury. It is now situated off Somerset Road in Salisbury.

References

Links
 

Schools in Salisbury
Special schools in Wiltshire
Academies in Wiltshire